Mount Albert may refer to:

Settlements
 Mount Albert, New Zealand, a suburb of Auckland, New Zealand
 Mount Albert (New Zealand electorate), based on Mount Albert
 Mount Albert by-election, 1947, a by-election held in Mount Albert in 1947
 Mount Albert by-election, 2009, a by-election held in Mount Albert in 2009
 Mount Albert Lions, a rugby league team
 Mount Albert, Ontario, an exurb not far from Toronto, Ontario, Canada
 Mont-Albert, Quebec, an unorganized territory
 Mont Albert, Victoria, a suburb of Melbourne, Victoria, Australia

Mountains
 Mount Albert (Canada), a mountain in British Columbia north of Princess Louisa Inlet
 Ōwairaka / Mount Albert, a volcanic cone in the Auckland Volcanic Field
 Albert Mountain (North Carolina), a mountain in North Carolina's Nantahala Range
 Mount Albert (Quebec), a mountain in Gaspesia's Chic-Choc Mountains Range
 Mount Albert Edward (British Columbia), a mountain on Vancouver Island
 Mount Albert, a spur to the south of Mount Victoria, Wellington